Boschetti is an Italian surname. Notable people with the surname include:

Americo Boschetti, Puerto Rican singer, composer and guitarist
Isabella Boschetti, Mantuan noblewoman
Ryan Boschetti, American football player

See also
17056 Boschetti, a main-belt asteroid

Italian-language surnames